The 21st Acrobatic Gymnastics World Championships were held in Glasgow, Scotland from 10–12 October 2008, at the Kelvin Hall.

Results

Men's Group

Men's Pair

Mixed Pair

Women's Group

Women's Pair

References
2008 Acrobatic Gymnastics World Championships results

Acrobatic Gymnastics World Championships
Acrobatic Gymnastics World Championships
Acrobatic Gymnastics World Championships
Acrobatic Gymnastics World Championships
Acrobatic Gymnastics
Acrobatic World 2008
Gymnastics in Scotland